This is a list of the animated Disney XD series, Randy Cunningham: 9th Grade Ninja episodes. A preview aired on August 13, 2012.

Series overview

Episodes

Season 1 (2012–14)
The first season of the American animated television series Randy Cunningham: 9th Grade Ninja aired from August 13, 2012 to February 8, 2014 and consisted of 52 episodes.

Season 2 (2014–15)
The second season of American animated television series Randy Cunningham: 9th Grade Ninja aired from July 19, 2014 to July 27, 2015.

References

Lists of American children's animated television series episodes
Lists of British children's television series episodes
Lists of British animated television series episodes
Lists of Disney Channel television series episodes